World on Fire is the twentieth studio album by Swedish virtuoso guitar player Yngwie Malmsteen and the eighth under this moniker. Initially it was programmed for April 2016, but then it was released on June 1 via Rising Force Records and Nexus. It was produced by Malmsteen himself and it was the second album in which Malmsteen sang also. This album was also the only one to feature drummer Mark Ellis.

Track listing
All tracks are written by Yngwie Malmsteen.

Personnel
Yngwie Malmsteen - guitars, vocals, bass guitars, keyboards, cello, sitar, producing, arrangement, orchestration
Mark Ellis - drums

Additional personnel
Nick Marinovich - additional keyboards
The Cantorum Choral Society - additional choir
The Miami-Dade Baroque String Ensemble - additional strings
Keith Rose - mixing
Jun Kawai - liner notes
Mariko Kawahara - lyrics translations

References

Yngwie Malmsteen albums
2016 albums